Myrsini is a village and a community in the municipality East Mani, Laconia, southern Greece. The community consists of the villages Myrsini and Profitis Ilias (before 1955: Τόμπρα - Tompra). The villages lie on the southern slopes of the Taygetus mountain range, in the Mani Peninsula at an altitude of  near the town of Gytheio.

References

External links
Mani in Greece

Populated places in Laconia
Populated places in the Mani Peninsula
East Mani